SM U-58 was one of the 329 submarines serving in the Imperial German Navy in World War I.
U-58 was engaged in the naval warfare and took part in the First Battle of the Atlantic.

Fate
The boat was sunk with the loss of two men and the capture of the rest of the crew in the action of 17 November 1917.

Summary of raiding history

References

Notes

Citations

Bibliography

World War I submarines of Germany
1916 ships
U-boats commissioned in 1916
Maritime incidents in 1917
U-boats sunk in 1917
Ships built in Bremen (state)
World War I shipwrecks in the Celtic Sea
U-boats sunk by depth charges
Type U 57 submarines